Ambrogio Pelagalli (born 15 February 1940) is an Italian former professional footballer who played as a defender or midfielder.

Career
Pelagalli played for 10 seasons (235 games, 5 goals) in Serie A for A.C. Milan, Atalanta and Roma, and made nearly 400 appearances in the Italian professional leagues.

Pelagalli was also a member of Italy's team at the 1960 Summer Olympics, but he did not play in any matches.

Honours
Milan
 Serie A champion: 1961–62

References

1940 births
Living people
Italian footballers
Association football defenders
Association football midfielders
A.C. Milan players
Atalanta B.C. players
A.S. Roma players
Taranto F.C. 1927 players
Piacenza Calcio 1919 players
Footballers at the 1960 Summer Olympics
Olympic footballers of Italy
Serie A players
Serie B players